AliensFest, formerly TheTechFest, is an independent technology and career conference in India for students held by EngineersHub. It also refers to the independent body from EngineersHub who organize the event along with other social initiatives and Outreach programs throughout the year. Events include tech talks, management talks, inspirational talks, workshops, project expo, experience zones, competitions, and exhibitions.

AliensFest started in 2016 as TheTechFest to create awareness in tech students about the latest technologies and motivate them to start building and showcasing their talent. Now it has grown to India's largest independent technology and career conference for students with a footfall of 5200.

AliensFest 5.0 
The fifth edition of AliensFest is scheduled with a gap of four years on 14 and 15 October 2023 due to COVID-19 Pandemic in 2020 & 2021. Theme and Venue of the event to be announced soon.

AliensFest 4.0 – Ignite the Spark - Gamify Edition
The fourth edition of AliensFest took place on 29 and 30 September 2019 at GITAM (Deemed to be University), Hyderabad. The theme for fourth edition is "Ignite the Spark".

AliensFest 3.0 – The Transformation
The third edition of AliensFest took place on 6 and 7 October 2018, in collaboration with the Technology Business Incubator at BITS Pilani in Hyderabad. The theme for third edition was "The Transformation."

The inaugural function was graced by Jayesh Ranjan, IT Secretary, Govt of Telangana, Prof Sunder Director of BITS Pilani, Hyderabad; Prof Aruna Malapati of TBI (Technology Business Incubator, BITS, Pilani).

This edition of AliensFest have witnessed an attendance of about 5000 students; the team organised 30 techtalks, including for about 25 workshops on various topics covering different streams of engineering. 25 projects were displayed in the Prototype Expo, and students from about 132 colleges across India attended the event.

Speakers at AliensFest 3.0

TheTechFest 2017 – Awaken the Future
TheTechFest 2017 was based on the theme Awaken the Future, where students were introduced to the various aspects of technology and disruptive thinking. TheTechFest 2017 was powered by CDK Global and in association with Facebook. The emphasis at TheTechFest 2017 was on technology and its applications rather than just engineering know-how. Attendance exceed 3200 participants. Guest speaker Ankur Mehra, Head of Media and Partnerships from Facebook India, spoke about culture and its importance. Over 1600 students attended the twenty-two workshops on various streams of engineering. Twenty projects were displayed in the Project Expo. Students from 96 colleges in India participated in the event.

Speakers at TheTechFest 2017

TheTechFest 2016 
The first edition of the AliensFest (TheTechFest) was in 2016 which started with the motto of promoting technology among the students and educate them by creating awareness among  them to start working on the latest technology and happenings in the corporates and help them in building their own products during their graduation by connecting the technology experts to students and also encourage student startups by providing support.

Around 2600 students from over 30 colleges participated in the first edition of TheTechFest, which included an introduction to Tech Talks, Workshops, and a Project Expo.

Speakers at TheTechFest 2016

References

External links 
Official AliensFest website
EngineersHub

Technology conferences
Technical festivals in India